On-yumishi Kanjuro Shibata XX (御弓師 二十代 柴田 勘十郎 Shibata Kanjūrō born 1921 in Kyoto, Japan, died on 21 October 2013 in Boulder, United States) was twentieth in a line of master bowmakers and a kyūdō teacher of the Heki Ryū Bishū Chikurin-ha (日置流尾州竹林派) tradition.  Beginning in 1980, Shibata founded over 25 kyūdōjō in the United States, Canada and Europe.

Career
Shibata served as the Bowmaker to the Emperor of Japan from 1959 until 1994, when his adopted son, Nobuhiro, was recognized as the 21st in the Shibata lineage and assumed the duties of Imperial Bowmaker.

Teaching style
In Japan, Shibata became concerned that his students were too fixated on merely hitting the target, and were treating kyūdō as a sport rather than a meditative art. He felt they were becoming too competitive. Shibata thus represents a view of kyūdō different from the All Japanese Kyūdō Federation (ZNKR) and Japanese Budō Association. Rather than as a meditative art, ZNKR promotes kyūdō as a traditional budō art combining equally both physical and mental development. These differences led Shibata to exclude his tradition from the official Japanese budō associations.

In 1980, Shibata accepted an invitation from Chögyam Trungpa Rinpoche to come to the United States and teach kyūdō, and founded the Ryūkō Kyūdōjō (龍虎弓道場 "dragon-tiger archery practice hall")   in Boulder, Colorado; it is now called the Zenko Iba.

Shibata did not rank his students (i.e. no belt or dan system), and there was and is no testing or contests within the schools he founded.

Quotations

See also
Japanese martial arts
Yumi

References

External links 
 Home page of Shibata's Kyudo school, Zenko International
 Home page of Heki Ryū Bishū Chikurin-ha group in Boston, Byakko Kyudojo
 
 Ten Years One Step a blog by Shibata's wife containing videos of Shibata.

1921 births
2013 deaths
Bowyers
Buddhist artists
Japanese archery
Japanese male archers